Walter W. Terry (April 1850 – February 20, 1908) was a first baseman and outfielder in Major League Baseball who played for the Washington Nationals of the National Association. Batting side and throwing arm are unknown.

A native of Pennsylvania, Terry debuted with the Nationals in 1875, playing for them six games between April 26 and May 5 of that year. He went 4-for-22 for a .182 batting average, including a triple, and drove in two runs.

Terry died in Elizabeth, New Jersey, at the age of 57.

Sources
Baseball Reference
Retrosheet

19th-century baseball players
Major League Baseball first basemen
Major League Baseball outfielders
Washington Nationals (NA) players
Baseball players from Pennsylvania
1850 births
1908 deaths
Date of birth unknown